Collins GAA was a Gaelic Athletic Association club based in the city of Cork in Ireland. The club was composed of military personnel who were based at Collins Barracks and fielded teams in both hurling and Gaelic football.

Honours

Cork Senior Football Championships: 4
 1929, 1949, 1951, 1953

Notable players

Miah Burke
Willie Donnelly
Bill Higgins
David Ahern
Maurice Murphy

References

Gaelic games clubs in County Cork
Gaelic football clubs in County Cork
Hurling clubs in County Cork